Martin St. Pierre (born 4 March 1972) is a Canadian racewalker. He competed in the men's 20 kilometres walk at the 1996 Summer Olympics.

References

External links
 

1972 births
Living people
Athletes (track and field) at the 1996 Summer Olympics
Canadian male racewalkers
Olympic track and field athletes of Canada
Place of birth missing (living people)